István Kiss (Biharillye, 8 June 1927 – Szekszárd, 29 December 1997) was a Hungarian sculptor and a member of the Hungarian Socialist Workers' Party Central Committee between 1975 and 1989.

Education
Kiss attended secondary school at Nagyszalonta and Újpest. In 1946 he was student of András Kocsis and Imre Kovács Turáni.

Offices
Kiss was a member of the Hungarian Socialist Workers' Party Central Committee between 22 March 1975 and 7 October 1989.

Works

One of his most notable sculptures is the Republic of Councils Monument (Hungarian: Tanácsköztársasági emlékmű), currently sitting at the Memento Park.

References

External links 

Members of the Hungarian Socialist Workers' Party
Hungarian sculptors
20th-century sculptors
Modern sculptors
1927 births
1997 deaths